The Blackford Oakes Reader is a 1999 book by William F. Buckley, Jr. It is a literary book in which Buckley explains where, when, why and how he created his Blackford Oakes series.

References

1999 books
Blackford Oakes novels
English-language novels